Noémie Audet-Verreault (born May 25, 1988) is a Canadian curler from Chicoutimi, Quebec. She currently skips her own team out of Quebec City.

Career
Verreault represented Quebec at back to back Canadian Mixed Curling Championships in 2009 and 2010 as third for Simon Hébert. In both years, the team finished with a 4–7 record, missing the playoffs.

Ten years later, Verreault won the 2020 Quebec Scotties Tournament of Hearts where her rink of Alanna Routledge, Marie-Pier Côté and Jill Routledge upset the Laurie St-Georges team in the provincial final. At the 2020 Scotties Tournament of Hearts, the team struggled throughout the week and ultimately finished tied for last with a winless 0–7 record.

Personal life
Verrault works as a research nurse for Ecogène-21. She is married to Matthieu Tremblay and has one daughter, Éva-Rose.

Teams

References

External links

1988 births
Canadian women curlers
Curlers from Quebec
Living people
Sportspeople from Saguenay, Quebec
People from Alma, Quebec
Canadian nurses
Canadian women nurses